is a Japanese basketball player. He competed in the 1972 and 1976 Summer Olympics.

At the 1976 Summer Olympics, he put up a noteworthy performance of 38 points and 10 assists gainst Puerto Rico.

References

1947 births
Living people
Basketball players at the 1972 Summer Olympics
Basketball players at the 1976 Summer Olympics
Japanese men's basketball players
Olympic basketball players of Japan
Sportspeople from Yamagata Prefecture
Asian Games medalists in basketball
Basketball players at the 1970 Asian Games
Asian Games bronze medalists for Japan
Medalists at the 1970 Asian Games